Kenneth Stewart Cole (July 10, 1900 – April 18, 1984) was an American biophysicist described by his peers as "a pioneer in the application of physical science to biology". Cole was awarded the National Medal of Science in 1967.

Biography
He was born on July 10, 1900 in Ithaca, New York to Charles Nelson Cole, an instructor in Latin at Cornell University and Mabel Stewart. Kenneth had a younger brother, with whom he remained very close throughout his life despite a large difference in age; they were joint authors of four papers published between 1936 and 1942.

In 1902 the family moved to Oberlin, Ohio, when his father took a post at Oberlin College. His father would later become the Dean. Kenneth's mother was, and Cole graduated from Oberlin College in 1922 and received a Ph.D. in physics with Floyd K. Richtmyer from Cornell University in 1926. He spent summers working at the General Electric laboratory in Schenectady, New York.

In 1932, Cole married Elizabeth Evans Roberts, an attorney. Later, her work was mostly concerned with civil rights and in 1957 she joined the staff of the United States Commission on Civil Rights

Kenneth joined the staff of Columbia University in 1937 and remained there until 1946. He had also been associated with the Presbyterian Hospital, and the Guggenheim Foundation for Advanced Study at Princeton University and the University of Chicago.

From 1949 to 1954 he was the technical director of the Naval Medicine Research Institute in Bethesda, Maryland. In 1954 he became chief of the laboratory of biophysics of the National Institute of Neurological Diseases and Blindness.

He achieved advances that led to the "sodium theory" of nerve transmission that later won Nobel Prizes for Alan L. Hodgkin and Andrew F. Huxley in 1963. Cole was elected a Fellow of the American Physical Society in 1931, a member of the National Academy of Sciences in 1956, and a Fellow of the American Academy of Arts and Sciences in 1964. He was awarded the National Medal of Science in 1967, the award citation, read: "As a result, we know far more about how the nervous system functions." In 1972 he was made a member of the Royal Society of London. The Biophysical Society awards the Kenneth S. Cole medal to a scientist studying cell membranes.

In 1980 he became an adjunct professor of the Department of Neurosciences at the Scripps Institute of Oceanography in San Diego. He had a son, Roger Braley Cole, and a daughter, Sarah Roberts Cole.

He died on April 18, 1984 in La Jolla, California.

Electrical Model of Tissue

Tissue can be modeled as an electrical circuit with resistive and capacitive properties:

Its dispersion and absorption are represented by the empirical formula:

The parameter  can assume values between 0 and 1, the former value giving the result of Debye for polar dielectrics. This expression requires that the locus of the dielectric constant in the complex plane be a circular arc with end points on the axis of reals and center below the axis.

It is worth emphasizing that the Cole–Cole model is an empirical model of the measured data. It has been successfully applied to a wide variety of tissues over the past 60 years, but it does not give any information about the underlying causes of the phenomena being measured.

Several references in the literature use a form of the Cole equation written in terms of impedance instead of a complex permittivity. The impedance  is given by:

DC) and infinity, respectively.  is often referred to as the characteristic frequency. The characteristic frequency is not the same when the analysis is carried out in terms of the complex permittivity.
A simple interpretation of the above equation is in terms of a circuit where a resistance  is in series with a capacitor  and this combination is placed in parallel with a resistance . It can be shown that  is given by

References

Publications
 Cole, K.S. 1928. Electrical Impedance of Suspensions of Spheres. Journal of General Physiology 
Cole, K.S. 1979. Mostly membranes. Annual Review of Physiology 41:1-23 
Cole, K. S., and R. H. Cole. 1941. Dispersion and absorption in dielectrics. J. Chem. Phys. 9:341-351 
Cole, K.S., and Baker, R.F. 1941. Longitudinal Impedance of the Squid Giant Axon. J. Gen. Physiol. 24:771-788 (Inductance of membrane)

External links
National Academy of Sciences Biographical Memoir

1900 births
1984 deaths
American biophysicists
20th-century American physicists
Columbia University staff
Cornell University alumni
Fellows of the American Academy of Arts and Sciences
Fellows of the American Physical Society
Foreign Members of the Royal Society
Manhattan Project people
Members of the United States National Academy of Sciences
National Medal of Science laureates
Oberlin College alumni
Scientists from Ithaca, New York
Scripps Institution of Oceanography faculty
Presidents of the Biophysical Society